Ghar Parivar is a 1991 Indian Bollywood film directed by Mohanji Prasad and produced by B. K. Parivar. It stars Rajesh Khanna, Rishi Kapoor, Moushumi Chatterjee and Meenakshi Seshadri. The film was 6th highest-grossing film of the year in 1991.

Cast

Soundtrack
Lyrics: Anjaan

References

External links

1990s Hindi-language films
1991 films
Films scored by Kalyanji Anandji
Indian family films
Indian drama films
Hindi-language drama films